Michel Gibrant García García (born 28 August 1986) is a Mexican former footballer. He last played for Alebrijes de Oaxaca.

Club career
García made his professional football debut during the Bicentenario 2010 campaign.

References

External links
  Stats provided by Mediotiempo
 

1986 births
Living people
Footballers from Mexico City
Association football midfielders
Mexican footballers
Club América footballers
Albinegros de Orizaba footballers
Club Necaxa footballers
Tampico Madero F.C. footballers
Alebrijes de Oaxaca players
Liga MX players